is a Japanese manga series written by Tensei Hagiwara and illustrated by Tomohiro Hashimoto and Tomoki Miyoshi. It is a spin-off of the main series Kaiji by Nobuyuki Fukumoto. It was serialized in Kodansha's Monthly Young Magazine from June 2015 to January 2018, and later moved to Comic Days manga app in March 2018 and finished in June 2020. Its chapters were collected in ten tankōbon volumes. The series comically depicts the struggles and conflicts of Tonegawa, a middle manager who is an executive of the Teiai Group and leads a large number of blacksuits, but is most concerned about the mood of the tyrannical Chairman Hyōdō.

An anime television series adaptation by Madhouse aired from July to December 2018 on Nippon TV's AnichU programming block. Sentai Filmworks have licensed the anime and an English dub began streaming on Hidive in August 2018. The show is also available for viewing on Crunchyroll.

As of November 2018, the manga had over 2.9 million copies in circulation.

Story
The story follows Yukio Tonegawa, the right-hand man of the company's chairman, Kazutaka Hyōdō, and the top executive of the Teiai Group, one of Japan's largest consumer finance conglomerates. In order to distract Chairman Hyōdō from boredom, Tonegawa gathers eleven of his blacksuit subordinates and forms Team Tonegawa in order to plan a so-called "game of death" that will keep Hyōdō pleased. Troubled by the Chairman's interference, the threat of loss of trust from Tonegawa's subordinates, illness, the members' blunders, and unplanned accidents, the team struggles in various ways to execute the project.

Characters

Team Tonegawa

One of the top executives of the Teiai Group and is a hard-working man with a good command of the human mind and high level of trust from his subordinates. However, he is not very good at reading Hyōdō's feelings, and he is often reprimanded for provoking his displeasure. Although he serves almost year-round, he is not rewarded much. In the past, he worked at the south Hateruma branch of Teiai, and he still has scars from being bitten by a sea snake there. His favorite foods are yakiniku and yakiniku bento.
He is last seen in the final chapter which takes place several years after he quit Teiai, staring at a setting sun on a beach in an unspecified location.

Initial Members

One of the initial black suits in the project team, 30 years old. He has worked directly under the Chairman and is a leader among the blacksuit members. At first he was dissatisfied with Tonegawa's arrogant work ethic, but after being touched by his hard work and honest personality, he changed his mind, and later became a loyal subordinate who could be called a confidant of Tonegawa. He is also in charge of taking care of Masayan.
In the final chapter, he becomes one of the senior members of Teiai and instructs his blacksuit subordinates.

One of the initial black suits, 23 years old. Before Nishiguchi joined, he was the youngest member of the team. He is remarkably capable of contributing and being flexible, such as coming up with ideas for Restricted Rock-Paper-Scissors, and stands out among the team for his creativity. On the other hand, he has a free-spirited side and behaves with abandon, which is typical of today's youth. He is a skilled mahjong player in Team Tonegawa and won the Tonegawa mahjong tournament. Being the only one of the early members to have a very unusual last name, he is often called "Saemon" by those around him.
In the final chapter, he resigns from Teiai and starts running an event management. He has an uxorilocal marriage with Saeko, changing his last name to Nishiguchi.

One of the initial black suits, 30 years old. He was the first member on the team to come down with the flu.
In the final chapter, he resigns from Teiai and gets a new job at a major bank.

One of the initial black suits, 35 years old. When he got married in chapter 25, it was revealed that his birthplace was Zambia, in southern Africa, and that he had aspired to be a comedian in the past.
In the final chapter, while still working as one of the blacksuits, he reunites with his former comedy duo partner. They lose in the second round of the M-1 Grand Prix, but he is still busy making up ideas.

One of the initial black suits, 32 years old. He likes planetariums and is the biggest bowling enthusiast on the team. He is interested in Nishiguchi and often invites her out for dinner. He is a bit of an airhead and makes a lot of careless remarks, and he is the only one who doesn't know about Saemon and Nishiguchi's love affairs at all. Despite being true to his own desires, he tends to act silly.
In the final chapter, he resigns from Teiai and becomes a professional manga artist. He works on a series of four-panel strips, but is having trouble with his editor, .

One of the initial black suits, 49 years old. He is the oldest person on the team. His career path has already been cut off, and he is concerned about it. He has spent his entire life running away from responsibility, but when Tonegawa comes down with the flu, he is directly ordered to be his substitute. Encouraged by Dōshita, he began to take on more responsibility.
In the final chapter, he is still working as one of the blacksuits, but he has won an award for his hobby of photography, and he confides to Yamazaki that he has found a way to love himself without having to get ahead.

One of the initial black suits, 32 years old. He is a former captain of the rugby team at T-Kyo University and an enthusiastic sportsman. Because he is sports-minded and hotblooded, he had the good sense to encourage Gonda, who served as Tonegawa's substitute. On the other hand, as pointed out by Nakata, his sports-minded attitude is difficult to get along with, and when Tonegawa had a medical checkup, he went to extreme lengths to control his diet (such throwing high-calorie lunch boxes in the trash), with Tonegawa describing himself as "a man under surveillance". He has a petite younger brother named Takashi who works part-time for Team Tonegawa. In the anime adaptation, he is shown to be willing to fully eat even the disgusting foods, such as grasshopper tsukudani and frog sausages.
In the final chapter, he returns to the PR department, creates a rugby club, and wins a tournament there.

One of the initial black suits, 25 years old. A representative troublemaker in the story who would later become the first defector. His enthusiasm and energy for his work are extraordinary, but he cannot see the big picture and is described by Tonegawa as "a cannon facing the wrong way". In chapter 62, he shows a decent side by giving advice to Kanie, a younger co-worker.
In the final chapter, he resigns from Teiai and his personality changes to the point that he feels like a different person. He opens a small shrimp roll shop in Nerima and starts a successful business.

Added Members

An assistant black suit hastily called in during Tonegawa's Human Mahjong project presentation. Though he is not an official member, but is always there to carry out chores. He is later promoted to an official member by filling in the vacant position due to Tsukui's elopement, with his former choreman position taken over by Ebitani. Real name unknown.

One of the added black suit members following the transfer of Hagio, Kikuchi and Nagata. She is 22 years old and the lone female black suit in Tonegawa's team, which is unusual for Teiai. She is from Hakata and has a brother named . In her private life, she posts selfies on social media and gives homemade cakes to other members. In addition, Tonegawa sometimes asks her to provide a "female perspective." She later had an office love affair with Saemon, but they soon broke up.
In the final chapter, she marries Saemonsaburō and has one daughter, but because she didn't want to have two "Sae" parts in the family register, she adopts him into her family and he changes his surname instead.

One of the added black suits. He is a temporary employee and has somewhat narrow eyes. He is not good at the basic skills needed in business culture such as reporting, contacting and discussing. His attempts at calling the steelworks so they can deliver required steel beams for the Steel Beam Crossing game all resulted in failure. Instead, he used a clothesline as a substitute, which resulted in all of the debtors surviving by forfeiting. Afterwards, he goes outside to a convenience store and is not seen again.

One of the added black suits from chapter 54 onwards. He is from Nagasaki.

One of the added black suits from chapter 54 onwards. He is from Takasaki.

One of the added black suits from chapter 54 onwards. Just like Saemon, he has an unusually complicated last name.

One of the added black suits from chapter 54 onwards. He is the only one of the Yamadas to have suffered from appendicitis in the past.

One of the added black suits from chapter 54 onwards. He has a small birthmark behind his ear.

One of the added black suits from chapter 54 onwards.

One of the added black suits from chapter 54 onwards.

One of the added black suits from chapter 54 onwards. Just like Saemon, he has an unusually complicated last name.

One of the added black suits from chapter 54 onwards. Just like Saemon, he has an unusually complicated last name. While the rest of the newly added members enjoy ordinary golf, he is the only one who enjoys minigolf.

A new graduate who appears in chapter 62. He is somewhat nervous and his heart throbs at the thought of picking up the phone. He is nicknamed  by Ebitani, which leads him to call Ebitani . He proposes the game of E-Card during a presentation and is given advice by his superior Ebitani. The game was successfully adopted afterwards.

Transferred Members

One of the initial black suits, 35 years old. He was later transferred to the Teiai branch office in south Hateruma with Kikuchi and Nagata. He has a younger twin brother  who was interviewed by Teiai while job hunting and rejected by Yamazaki due to having the same last name and face as that of his older brother.
While he, Kikuchi and Nagata returned to Teiai HQ in chapter 75 as new members of Team Tonegawa, they got transferred yet again in the final chapter, this time to the branch office in Sarobetsu Plain.

One of the initial black suits. He is 35 years old.

One of the initial black suits. He is 37 years old.

One of the added black suits. He is a former salesman who joined Teiai as a mid-career hire. After literally bending over backwards for Hyōdō's attention, he becomes the Chairman's secretary.

Miscellaneous

A former restaurant employee who looks identical to Chairman Hyōdō, nicknamed . He was recruited by Teiai to serve as a diabolical body double under Hyōdō's orders. Despite being the exact opposite to the Chairman in terms of personality, he nevertheless becomes able to reproduce his personality through special training. In Yamazaki's absence, he was spoiled by Team Tonegawa, which led to him ranking everyone except Yamazaki lower than himself, and he went out of his way to break everyone's personal belongings, but is eventually corrected by Kurosaki. From then on, he has been fearful of Kurosaki, and the phrase "Kuro's coming!" is enough to get him to behave. He has a younger twin brother named . In chapter 71.5, he reverts to his former personality and returns home.

A monitoring blacksuit from the Teiai underground forced labor facility who also appears in the spin-off 1-nichi Gaishutsuroku Hanchō. He makes his first appearance in this series in chapter 74, asking the T-AI Boy robot to read his palm.

One of Tonegawa's classmates from high school days.

One of Tonegawa's classmates from high school days. He and Tonegawa are known as the "Great Rivers Duo" because their surnames derive from real-life Japanese rivers (Tone River and Shinano River).

One of Tonegawa's classmates from high school days.

One of Tonegawa's classmates from high school days. Tonegawa was her first love.

One of Tonegawa's classmates from high school days.

Teiai Group Executives

 An old man who is the diabolical leader of the Teiai Group. He is called "Chairman" by his subordinates. There is more emphasis put on his old man qualities than in the main story, such as going to bed immediately at 10 PM and not skimping on skin care in the fall and winter. In the short story written by the original author, Fukumoto, he is depicted as caring about his son Kazuya's friendships.

One of the top executives in the Teiai Group and a rival to Tonegawa, who is vying for the No. 2 spot in the Teiai Group. In contrast to Tonegawa, he has a knack for getting on Hyōdō's good side and often makes sharp and pointed remarks. As told by Tonegawa, he can always point out things that are hard to say without hesitation, and it always leads to a positive response. For the most part, he is gentle and aloof enough to make Hyōdō falter at times, but he is also ruthless enough to violently slap the unruly Masayan and make him calm down in an instant with his dark expression, which has traumatized him since then.

Related Teiai Group Persons

A yakuza and president of the Teiai-affiliated company Endō Finance. Since he works under Tonegawa, he often appears as a supporting character. He tends to sympathize with Tonegawa, but due to his outrageous "favors" such as brainwashing recently-graduated blacksuits more than necessary and dumping Masayan in the woods without permission, Tonegawa becomes wary of how he always shows up at odd times and how whatever he does always leads to negative consequences.

A young manager of a Teiai-affiliated underground casino that hosts the man-eating pachinko known as "The Bog". In order to recover the 1.5 billion yen that the Bog has swallowed, he entertains Tonegawa when he visits the casino. However, the reception was very poor, and Tonegawa is appalled by how blatantly rigged the Bog's settings are.

Ichijou's underling and senior staff of the underground casino that Ichijō manages. At Ichijō's command, he blatantly rigged the settings of the Bog.

A representative of the Kansai branch of the Teiai Group. He is always high-handed and self-centered, ranting and yelling at his subordinates ("a yakuza-like man," according to Tonegawa).

One of the debtors. Before becoming indebted, he had a problematic personality as a working adult, and despite his good age, he is selfish and enjoys horse racing. When he first appeared, he was dressed similarly to Kaiji in the Espoir arc, but with round facial features in contrast to Kaiji's more pointed chin and nose. Endō summons him to his lecture about multiple debtors where his childish actions are shown, such as spending company money on pachinko and using the money that his mother collected from other relatives to bet on horse racing instead of paying his debts.

One of the debtors. Aspiring to be a comedian, he demonstrates his comedy routine to President Hyōdō and Tonegawa in an attempt to promote himself. He draws the ire of Chairman Hyōdō, who calls him a genuine idiot who is not worthy of ridicule at all, while Tonegawa has to pretend he isn't amused by feigning a yawn. In the end, Aida is sent underground and manages to amuse Isawa with his jokes there. He appears in chapter 61 of 1-nichi Gaishutsuroku Hanchō, where his aftermath is depicted.

The protagonist of the main series. He appears in several recap scenes as well as the end of episode 13 in the anime adaptation. He does not appear in the manga, only referred to by name in one line of narration dialogue in chapter 59.

Underground Labor Facility

The foreman of Squad E in the underground facility and protagonist of his own spin-off series 1-nichi Gaishutsuroku Hanchō. He witnessed Aida's comedy routine in chapter 50, but was not amused. He also encounters Tonegawa in the "Tonegawa vs. Foreman" one-shot.

Ootsuki's close aide. He witnessed Aida's comedy routine in chapter 50, but was also not amused.

Ootsuki's close aide. He witnessed Aida's comedy routine in chapter 50 and was the only one of the three who laughed.

Media

Manga
Chūkan Kanriroku Tonegawa is written by Tensei Hagiwara and illustrated by Tomohiro Hashimoto and Tomoki Miyoshi, with cooperation from Nobuyuki Fukumoto. Hashimoto and Miyoshi have both worked as assistants for the main Kaiji series, and this series is drawn in a similar style to the original. It was serialized in Kodansha's Monthly Young Magazine from June 20, 2015 to January 23, 2018. The manga was transferred to Comic Days manga app, beinga published from March 5, 2018 to June 8, 2020. Kodansha has compiled its chapters into ten individual tankōbon volumes, published from December 4, 2015 to August 11, 2020.

Volume list

Anime

An anime television series adaptation was announced in February 2018. Produced by Nippon TV, VAP, Nippon Television Music Corporation and Madhouse, it is directed by Keiichiro Kawaguchi, with Mitsutaka Hirota handling series composition, Haruhito Takada designing the characters and Takahiro Yamada composing the music. It ran for 24 episodes on Nippon TV's AnichU programming block from July 4 to December 26, 2018. Jay Kabira served as the series' narrator, and each episode includes different voice actresses and actors for the trademark sound effect "Zawa Zawa", among which are: Masako Nozawa, Miyuki Sawashiro, Yū Serizawa, Ari Ozawa, Kana Hanazawa, Tomoyo Kurosawa, Shiori Izawa, Megumi Han, Chō and Chiharu Sawashiro. The series also includes segments covering a portion of chapters from 1-nichi Gaishutsuroku Hanchō, a spin-off manga about the foreman Ōtsuki. VAP has published the series on two DVD and Blu-ray box sets between December 12, 2018 and March 27, 2019, with the second set including a drama CD that adapted chapters from Hanchō not shown in the anime. Amazon-exclusive pre-order bonuses included a Teiai blacksuit-themed Rubik's Cube and Match Up card game. A 32-track original soundtrack was released on August 22, 2018.

Sentai Filmworks have licensed the anime and an English dub began streaming on Hidive on August 3, 2018. Sentai Filmworks released the series on Blu-ray on October 15, 2019. The show is also available for viewing on Crunchyroll.

Reception
The series topped the 2017 list of Takarajimasha's Kono Manga ga Sugoi! guidebook top 20 manga for male readers. In 2018, the manga was among the top 20 best-selling Amazon Kindle books in Japan, ranked at #16, based on sales data between November 13, 2017 and October 31, 2018. As of November 2018, the manga had over 2.9 million copies in circulation.

Anime News Network had four editors review the first episode of the anime series. Paul Jensen wrote that the series would mainly appeal to Kaiji fans, but that "it could be amusing enough to lure in other viewers as long as it gives its humor some much-needed breathing room". Theron Martin stated that just the few minutes of recap shown at the beginning of the first episode is enough to make the series accessible to newcomers. Martin had a positive impression about the comedy of the series, and stated that it could find its "own niche and faithful following". James Beckett said that the series is aimed "exclusively at middle-aged Japanese viewers who can empathize with the highs and lows of being the middle manager of a large corporation (criminal or otherwise)". Rebecca Silverman called it "the character designs are interesting but not particularly attractive and the color palette mostly blacks and grays doesn't help,". Silverman concluded; "There's just not enough in this episode to make me want to go any further with the series – because ultimately watching the game play out is more interesting than watching someone build it".

Paul Chapman of Crunchyroll recommended the anime series, stating that it is "sure to appeal to any anime fan that's ever had to put their nose to the 9-to-5 corporate grindstone". Chris Beveridge of The Fandom Post, in his review of the Blu-ray release of the series, gave it a "B+" grade. Beveridge wrote; "Tonegawa's a great character to watch – just having someone like him as a lead is a wonderful change from the norm to begin with – and what we get here definitely delights". He concluded; "I do think this is a bit of an acquired taste but those that "get it" will love it so much and will want a whole lot more". Amy McNulty of Anime News Network, ranked the series fourth on her list of "The Best Anime of 2018". In another article, McNulty listed Mr. Tonegawa: Middle Management Blues as one of the "Best Anime of Fall 2018".

Notes

References

Further reading

External links
  
  
 
  
 

Anime series based on manga
Anime spin-offs
Comics spin-offs
Kaiji (manga)
Kodansha manga
Madhouse (company)
Nippon TV original programming
Nobuyuki Fukumoto
Office work in popular culture
Parody anime and manga
Prequel comics
Seinen manga
Sentai Filmworks